The following outline is provided as an overview of and topical guide to Kenya:

Kenya is a country in East Africa. The capital city is Nairobi, 2nd largest in Africa (after Cairo). Kenya spans an area about 85% the size of France or Texas. The population has grown rapidly in recent decades to roughly 38 million. Kenya has numerous wildlife reserves, containing thousands of animal species. During the presidency of Jomo Kenyatta in the 1960s, the current English pronunciation of  became widespread because his name retained the native pronunciation. Before 1920, the area now known as Kenya was known as the British East Africa Protectorate and so there was no need to mention mount when referring to the mountain.

General reference

 Pronunciation:  or 
 Common English country name:  Kenya
 Official English country name:  The Republic of Kenya
 Common endonym(s):  
 Official endonym(s):  
 Adjectival(s): Kenyan
 Demonym(s):
 International rankings of Kenya
 ISO country codes:  KE, KEN, 404
 ISO region codes:  See ISO 3166-2:KE
 Internet country code top-level domain:  .ke

Geography of Kenya

Geography of Kenya
 Kenya is: a country
 Location:
 Eastern Hemisphere, on the Equator
 Africa
 East Africa
 Time zone(s):
 Land boundaries:  3,477 km
 933 km
 861 km
 769 km
 682 km
 232 km
 Coastline:  Indian Ocean  536 km
 Population of Kenya: 37,538,000  – 34th most populous country

 Area of Kenya: 580,367 km2
 Atlas of Kenya

Environment of Kenya

Environment of Kenya
 Climate of Kenya
 Ecology of Kenya
 Ecoregions in Kenya
 Renewable energy in Kenya
 Protected areas of Kenya
 Biosphere reserves in Kenya
 National parks of Kenya
 Wildlife of Kenya
 Fauna of Kenya
 Birds of Kenya
 Mammals of Kenya

Natural geographic features of Kenya

 Glaciers of Kenya
 Lakes of Kenya
 Mountains of Kenya
 Volcanoes in Kenya
 Rivers of Kenya
 World Heritage Sites in Kenya

Regions of Kenya

Regions of Kenya

Ecoregions of Kenya

List of ecoregions in Kenya
 Ecoregions in Kenya

Administrative divisions of Kenya

Administrative divisions of Kenya
 Counties of Kenya

Counties of Kenya

Counties of Kenya
Kenya is divided into 47 Counties

Municipalities of Kenya

List of cities in Kenya
 Capital of Kenya: Nairobi
Major towns:

Some smaller towns:

Demography of Kenya

Demographics of Kenya

Government and politics of Kenya

Politics of Kenya
 Form of government:
 Capital of Kenya: Nairobi
 Elections in Kenya
 Political parties in Kenya

Branches of the government of Kenya

Government of Kenya

Executive arm of the government of Kenya
 Head of State: President of Kenya, Uhuru Kenyatta
 Cabinet of Kenya

Legislative branch of the government of Kenya
 Parliament of Kenya (bicameral)
Senate (upper house)
The National Assembly (lower house)

Judicial branch of the government of Kenya

Court system of Kenya
 Supreme Court of Kenya

Foreign relations of Kenya

Foreign relations of Kenya
 Diplomatic missions in Kenya
 Diplomatic missions of Kenya

International organisation membership

International organization membership of Kenya
Kenya is a member of:
The Republic of Kenya is a member of:

African, Caribbean, and Pacific Group of States (ACP)
African Development Bank Group (AfDB)
African Union (AU)
African Union/United Nations Hybrid operation in Darfur (UNAMID)
Common Market for Eastern and Southern Africa (COMESA)
Commonwealth of Nations
East African Community (EAC)
East African Development Bank (EADB)
Food and Agriculture Organization (FAO)
Group of 15 (G15)
Group of 77 (G77)
Inter-Governmental Authority on Development (IGAD)
International Atomic Energy Agency (IAEA)
International Bank for Reconstruction and Development (IBRD)
International Civil Aviation Organization (ICAO)
International Criminal Court (ICCt)
International Criminal Police Organization (Interpol)
International Development Association (IDA)
International Federation of Red Cross and Red Crescent Societies (IFRCS)
International Finance Corporation (IFC)
International Fund for Agricultural Development (IFAD)
International Labour Organization (ILO)
International Maritime Organization (IMO)
International Mobile Satellite Organization (IMSO)
International Monetary Fund (IMF)
International Olympic Committee (IOC)
International Organization for Migration (IOM)
International Organization for Standardization (ISO)

International Red Cross and Red Crescent Movement (ICRM)
International Telecommunication Union (ITU)
International Telecommunications Satellite Organization (ITSO)
International Trade Union Confederation (ITUC)
Inter-Parliamentary Union (IPU)
Multilateral Investment Guarantee Agency (MIGA)
Nonaligned Movement (NAM)
Organisation for the Prohibition of Chemical Weapons (OPCW)
Permanent Court of Arbitration (PCA)
United Nations (UN)
United Nations Conference on Trade and Development (UNCTAD)
United Nations Educational, Scientific, and Cultural Organization (UNESCO)
United Nations High Commissioner for Refugees (UNHCR)
United Nations Industrial Development Organization (UNIDO)
United Nations Mission for the Referendum in Western Sahara (MINURSO)
United Nations Mission in Liberia (UNMIL)
United Nations Mission in the Sudan (UNMIS)
United Nations Operation in Cote d'Ivoire (UNOCI)
United Nations Organization Mission in the Democratic Republic of the Congo (MONUC)
Universal Postal Union (UPU)
World Customs Organization (WCO)
World Federation of Trade Unions (WFTU)
World Health Organization (WHO)
World Intellectual Property Organization (WIPO)
World Meteorological Organization (WMO)
World Tourism Organization (UNWTO)
World Trade Organization (WTO)

Law and order in Kenya

Law of Kenya
 Constitution of Kenya
 Crime in Kenya
 Human rights in Kenya
 LGBT rights in Kenya
 Law enforcement in Kenya

Military of Kenya

Military of Kenya
 Command
 Commander-in-chief:
 Forces
 Army of Kenya
 Navy of Kenya
 Air Force of Kenya

Local government in Kenya

Local government in Kenya

History of Kenya

History of Kenya
Current events of Kenya
 Military history of Kenya
 Related: Arab slave trade

Culture of Kenya

Culture of Kenya
 Cuisine of Kenya
 Languages of Kenya
 Media in Kenya
 National symbols of Kenya
 Coat of arms of Kenya
 Flag of Kenya
 National anthem of Kenya
 Prostitution in Kenya
 Public holidays in Kenya
 Religion in Kenya
 Christianity in Kenya
 Hinduism in Kenya
 Islam in Kenya
 World Heritage Sites in Kenya
 Lamu
 Lake Turkana National Parks
 Sacred Mijikenda Kaya Forests

The arts in Kenya
 Cinema of Kenya
 Literature of Kenya
 Music of Kenya
 Video gaming in Kenya

Sports in Kenya

Sports in Kenya
 Football in Kenya
Kenya at the Olympics

Economy and infrastructure of Kenya

Economy of Kenya
 Economic rank, by nominal GDP (2007): 81st (eighty-first)
 Agriculture in Kenya
 Poultry farming in Kenya
 Banking in Kenya
 National Bank of Kenya
 Kenya Commercial Bank
 Communications in Kenya
 Internet in Kenya
 Companies of Kenya
Currency of Kenya: Shilling
ISO 4217: KES
 Energy in Kenya
 Health care in Kenya
 Mining in Kenya
 Kenya Stock Exchange
 Nairobi Stock Exchange
 Tourism in Kenya
 Shopping malls in Kenya
 Hypermarkets in Kenya
 Transport in Kenya
 List of airlines in Kenya
 Air transport in Kenya
 Airports in Kenya
 Kenya Airways
 Rail transport in Kenya
 Roads in Kenya
 Water supply and sanitation in Kenya

Education in Kenya

Education in Kenya

Health in Kenya 

Health in Kenya

See also

Kenya
Index of Kenya-related articles
List of international rankings
List of Kenya-related topics
Member state of the Commonwealth of Nations
Member state of the United Nations
Outline of Africa
Outline of geography

References

External links

 Government
Government Spokesperson Office of the Government Spokesperson of the Republic of Kenya.
Government of Kenya Official site.
Kenya Law Reports Kenyan Legislation, Case Law, Official Gazette Notices and legal Info.
State House Kenya Official site State House, Kenya.
Central Bank of Kenya Currency exchange rates official site.

 News
Kenya Broadcasting Corporation State run media organisation
Daily Nation Online Local independent newspaper
Business Daily Africa Kenya's Financial Daily
The East African Authoritative Weekly
East African Business Week Business News for Kenya, Uganda, Tanzania, Rwanda and Burundi
The Standard Online Local independent newspaper
allAfrica.com – Kenya news headlines
IRIN Kenya humanitarian news and analysis

 Overviews
Rural poverty in Kenya (IFAD)
 
 Encyclopædia Britannica, Kenya – Country Page
 CIA World Factbook – Kenya
 US State Department – Kenya includes Background Notes, Country Study and major reports
 Guardian (UK) Special Report Recent reports and

 Directories
Columbia University Libraries – Kenya directory category of the WWW-VL
Open Directory Project – Kenya directory category
Stanford University – Africa South of the Sahara: Kenya directory category
East African Web Directory Kenya Web sites

 Travel & Tourism
Kenya Tourist Board (Magical Kenya) Official travel and tourism guide.

Kenya Photos

Kenya